Pathaaka is a 2006 Indian Malayalam film,  directed by  K. Madhu. The film stars Suresh Gopi, Navya Nair, Sai Kumar and Lalu Alex in lead roles. The film had musical score by Tej.

Cast

Suresh Gopi as G.T/C.M George Thariyan
Manoj K Jayan as City Police Commissioner Harinarayanan IPS
Arun as Anwer
Renuka Menon as Meera Menon
Sindhu Menon as Namitha Choudari IPS
Sheela as Elizhabeth Mammen
Navya Nair as Ashitha Muhammed
Sai Kumar as Minister Farookh Shah
Lalu Alex as Chief Minister Nandakumar
Subair as Rasheed
Vijayakumar as Asharuff, GT's Gunman
Janardhanan as Muhammed Mash
Venu Nagavally as Shekharji/Shekaran
Sreelatha Namboothiri as Kunjamma
Devan as Rajan Nadar
Kollam Thulasi as Joseph Xavier
Mukundan as Gouthaman
Shammi Thilakan as Monipalli Damodaran
Madhupal as Pratheesh Nambiyar
Manu Raj as Manikandan
Krishnapriya as Reshmi
Ravi Menon as Kellappan Nair
Kunchan as Bapputty
Bindu Panicker as Mollykutty
Kochu Preman as Aravindan
Biju Pappan as Circle Inspector Suresh
Meghanathan as City Police Commissioner Yousuf Ali IPS
Ajay Rathnam as Vincent Mozes
Nishanth Sagar as Murugadas

References

External links
 
 

2006 films
2000s Malayalam-language films
Films directed by K. Madhu